Saint Michael College of Caraga also referred to by its acronym SMCC is a private, Roman Catholic, basic education and higher education institution run by the Roman Catholic Diocese of Butuan in Nasipit, Agusan del Norte in the Philippines. It was established in 1948 by the Missionaries of the Sacred Heart (MSC) fathers. Its main campus is located at Atupan Street, Barangay 4 Poblacion, Nasipit, Agusan del Norte. The second campus is located in Brgy. Triangulo houses the elementary department.

History

In 1948, Nasipit was still a part of the parish of Buenavista, whose parish priest was the late Fr. Martin Westeinde, a Dutch MSC. As the town progressed, population also increased and business gained momentum with the start of the logging industry of Nasipit Lumber Company (NALCO). Fr Martin and his co-adjutor Fr. Atanacio de Castro saw the need of putting up a secondary school. Fr. De Castro was placed in charge of the school.

It started its operation on July 1, 1948, with Rev. Fr. Francisco Van Dyke as the first director. He was succeeded by Rev. Fr. Enrique Van Ma-anen, Rev. Fr. Vicente Portillo, Rev. Fr. Mateo Van Santvoord, and Rev. Fr. Anthony Krol in that order of succession. Rev. Fr. Krol was the last Dutch priest who served as the school director.

Fr. Gerard Cruijen, one of the subsequent directors, converted the nipa- wooden structure into a two-storey building with 16 classrooms.

When the Filipinization Law was implemented in 1975 a layman, Mr Gregorio Orais, became the first layman school director until he retired in 1977. He was followed by Mr. Antonio L. Suarez, the first layman director/principal of the school. Faro Gatchalian followed until 1985, then Mrs. Necita Lim took the helm of directorship until 1991 while acting also as the principal of St. James High School of Buenavista, an adjacent town of Nasipit. In 1991, Fr. Achilles Ayaton became the school director until 1993. In 1994, Msgr. Cesar L. Gatela took over the school's directorship until 1999, when he succumbed to a cardiac arrest. In his term, he bought 19 computers integrating the Computer technology subject in all levels of the High School Department.

The Teatro, Sayaw, at Awit Production(TESAW Production), Center of the Michaelinian Performing Arts was established on June 1, 1997, with Dr. Dennis P. Mausisa as the founder and artistic director.

In 1999, Msgr. Juan de Dios Pueblos, the Bishop of Butuan appointed Msgr. Bienvinido A. Betaizar, PC as the school director who was later promoted as School President until at present.

June 2000, Msgr. Betaizar opened the Grade School department with Mrs. Minda R. Cocon as the first Principal offering Grades I-IV and the College Department with Technical Courses offering with Mr. Antonio L. Suarez as the college administrator until his death in February 2002.

June 2001, Baccalaureate Programs were opened which include Bachelor of Elementary Education, Bachelor of Secondary Education major in English, Bachelor of Science in Business Administration major in Financial Management and Bachelor of Arts in English Language. The Planning and Development Center was established with Dr. Dennis P. Mausisa as the Head of Office.

February 16, 2001, the name Saint Michael's Institute was replaced with Saint Michael College of Caraga as suggested by Mrs. Vanica P. del Rosario during the 1st SMI General Assembly. The name was duly approved by the Securities and Exchange Commission.

In 2002, within three years of operation the College Department was named as one of the Top Three Performing Schools in the Caraga for the Kabalikat Award 2002 of TESDA. Additional courses were opened like 2-Year Computer-Based Accounting Technology, 2 Year Tourism Technology and 2 Year Computer-Technician. Speech subject was introduced in all departments complete with the state of the art speech facilities.

2003, the Accounting Department was established.

June 10, 2005, a four-storey concrete building was inaugurated. The Elementary Department was transferred from the Montinola Building to the main campus where the new building is situated. The new building housed the different offices, Preschool, High School, Mini Hotel, AVR and Faculty Rooms. Bachelor of Science in Computer Science was opened. Mini School bus was acquired.

2006, SMCC Angel Festival was introduced by Dr. Mausisa to the Michaelinian community.

2007, SMCC launches the SMCC Website www.smccnasipit.edu.ph.

2008, College Department awarded by TESDA Region XIII as MODEL TVET Provider School in Agusan del Norte-Butuan City. The SMCC school logo was changed.

2009, Bureau of Immigration granted the school the accreditation permit to accept Foreign Students from Preschool to College. Commission on Higher Education granted the permit to operate Bachelor of Science in Hotel and Restaurant Management.

2010, Bachelor of Science in Information Technology and One Year Seafarer were opened.

2012, additional programs were opened the Bachelor of Science in Criminology, Bachelor of Science in Tourism Management, additional majors in Secondary Education in Math and Science, and the Housekeeping NCII. TESDA bundled programs were opened the Two year Hotel and Restaurant Management with qualifications in Food and Beverage Services NC II and Housekeeping NCII, Two year Information Technology with qualifications in Computer Hardware Servicing NCII and Computer Programming NC IV and Two year Computer Electronics Servicing NC II. New School's Vision and Mission Statement(DBES) as agreed by the DBES Board.

At present, SMCC is one of the Catholic schools in Agusan del Norte and Caraga region.

Departments

 Elementary Department
 Preschool, Grades 1-6
 Junior High School Department
 Grade 7, Grade 8, Grade 9, Grade 10
 Senior High School Department
 Grade 11 and 12
 Strands: General Academic Strand (GAS), Humanities and Social Sciences (HUMSS), Science and Technology, Engineering, and Mathematics (STEM), Accounting, Business, and Management (ABM), Maritime, Home Economics and Information Technology
 Colleges
 College of Tourism Hospitality Business and Management
 College of Teacher Education
 College of Arts and Sciences
 College of Computing and Information Sciences
 College of Criminal Justice Education
 Technical Department

School's Radio Station
The school FM station is DXSM 89.5 Kabayaning Michaelinian FM. It was first heard on the 1st of December 2017. The radio station now is the arm of the school to promote Catholic Education and teachings.

Official publication
The Saint Michael College of Caraga has its own publication called the Michaelinian Mirror, which is the only publication in the school. It publishes the latest news and events inside the school.

External links
 
 SMCC Official Website

Catholic universities and colleges in the Philippines
Universities and colleges in Agusan del Norte